Casper Jørgensen (born 20 August 1985) is a retired Danish professional racing cyclist. He was forced to retire due to a knee injury. He is the current national team coach for the Men's team pursuit.

Career highlights

 2002: 2nd in National Championship, Track, 1 km, Elite, Denmark (DEN)
 2002: 2nd in National Championship, Track, 1 km, Juniors, Denmark (DEN)
 2002: 1st in National Championship, Track, Pursuit, Juniors, Denmark (DEN)
 2002: 2nd in National Championship, Track, Team Pursuit, Elite, Denmark (DEN)
 2002: 1st in National Championship, Track, Team Pursuit, Juniors, Denmark (DEN)
 2002: 3rd in National Championship, Track, Points race, Juniors, Denmark (DEN)
 2003: 2nd in National Championship, Track, 1 km, Elite, Denmark (DEN)
 2003: 1st in National Championship, Track, 1 km, Juniors, Denmark (DEN)
 2003: 1st in National Championship, Track, Pursuit, Juniors, Denmark (DEN)
 2003: 1st in National Championship, Track, Team Pursuit, Elite, Denmark (DEN)
 2003: 1st in National Championship, Track, Team Pursuit, Juniors, Denmark (DEN)
 2003: 3rd in National Championship, Track, Points race, Juniors, Denmark (DEN)
 2004: 2nd in National Championship, Track, 1 km, Elite, Denmark (DEN)
 2004: 2nd in National Championship, Track, Pursuit, U23, Denmark (DEN)
 2004: 1st in National Championship, Track, Scratch, Elite, Denmark (DEN)
 2004: 1st in National Championship, Track, Team Pursuit, Elite, Denmark, Odense (DEN)
 2005: 2nd in National Championship, Track, 1 km, Elite, Denmark (DEN)
 2005: 2nd in National Championship, Track, Pursuit, Elite, Denmark (DEN)
 2005: 1st in National Championship, Track, Team Pursuit, Elite, Denmark (DEN)
 2005: 2nd in National Championship, Track, Points race, Elite, Denmark (DEN)
 2006: 3rd in National Championship, Track, 1 km, Elite, Denmark (DEN)
 2006: 2nd in National Championship, Track, Pursuit, Elite, Denmark (DEN)
 2006: 1st in National Championship, Track, Team Pursuit, Elite, Denmark (DEN)
 2006: 1st in National Championship, Track, Scratch, Elite, Denmark (DEN)
 2006: 1st in Sydney, Team Pursuit (AUS)
 2006: 2nd in Thy (DEN)
 2006: 3rd in UIV Cup Amsterdam, U23, Amsterdam (NED)
 2006: 2nd in Sydney, Team Pursuit (AUS)
 2007: 2nd in Los Angeles, Team Pursuit (USA)
 2007: 3rd in World Championship, Track, Team Pursuit, Elite, Palma de Mallorca (SPA)
 2007: 3rd in Herning, Herning (DEN)
 2007: 1st in Prologue GP Tell, Luzern (SUI)
 2007: 3rd in National Championship, Road, ITT, U23, Denmark, Odder (DEN)
 2007: 2nd in National Championship, Track, Pursuit, Elite, Denmark, Ballerup (DEN)
 2007: 1st in National Championship, Track, Team Pursuit, Elite, Denmark, Ballerup (DEN)
 2007: 1st in National Championship, Track, Scratch, Elite, Denmark, Ballerup (DEN)
 2007: 2nd in National Championship, Track, 1 km, Elite, Denmark, Ballerup (DEN)
 2007: 3rd in National Championship, Track, Points race, Elite, Denmark, Ballerup (DEN)
 2007: 3rd in UIV Cup Amsterdam, U23 (NED)
 2007: 2nd in National Championship, Track, Madison, Elite, Denmark, Ballerup (DEN)
 2008: 2nd in Los Angeles, Team Pursuit (USA)

External links

1985 births
Living people
Danish male cyclists
Cyclists at the 2008 Summer Olympics
Olympic cyclists of Denmark
Olympic silver medalists for Denmark
Olympic medalists in cycling
Medalists at the 2008 Summer Olympics
Place of birth missing (living people)
UCI Track Cycling World Champions (men)
Danish track cyclists